Marcel Błachewicz (born 6 May 2003) is a Polish professional footballer who plays as a left-back for Bruk-Bet Termalica Nieciecza, on loan from Wisła Płock.

Career statistics

Club

Notes

References

2003 births
Living people
Polish footballers
Poland youth international footballers
Poland under-21 international footballers
Association football defenders
Ekstraklasa players
I liga players
Legia Warsaw players
Wisła Płock players
Bruk-Bet Termalica Nieciecza players